New Berlin is a borough in Union County, Pennsylvania, United States. The population was 791 at the  census.

History
The New Berlin Presbyterian Church and Old Union County Courthouse are listed on the National Register of Historic Places.

Geography
New Berlin is located at  (40.880416, -76.986268).

The Borough of New Berlin is located in central Pennsylvania, on the southern edge of Union County. It sits along the north side of Penns Creek, where the south bank of said creek is the dividing line between Union and Snyder County. New Berlin is a small borough, with a population of 791 ( census). Union County was created from Northumberland County on March 22, 1813, and nearby Mifflinburg was the first county seat (the first courthouse was located at 406 Green Street, with other government offices in various other buildings).  New Berlin became the second seat of county government when the first courthouse built specifically for that purpose was completed in 1815.  The present day county seat was moved to Lewisburg in 1855. The Old Union County Courthouse still stands on the Town Square and houses the New Berlin Post Office and the Courthouse Museum.

Demographics

As of the census of 2000, there were 838 people, 333 households, and 243 families residing in the borough. The population density was 1,882.4 people per square mile (719.0/km2). There were 355 housing units at an average density of 797.4 per square mile (304.6/km2). The racial makeup of the borough was 98.45% White, 0.24% African American, 0.60% from other races, and 0.72% from two or more races. Hispanic or Latino of any race were 0.95% of the population. Ancestries: German (41.2%), United States (11.1%), English (6.1%), Irish (5.6%), Italian (4.1%), French (3.0%).

There were 333 households, out of which 34.8% had children under the age of 18 living with them, 62.5% were married couples living together, 8.4% had a female householder with no husband present, and 27.0% were non-families. 23.1% of all households were made up of individuals, and 10.8% had someone living alone who was 65 years of age or older. The average household size was 2.52 and the average family size was 2.98.

In the borough the population was spread out, with 27.8% under the age of 18, 5.1% from 18 to 24, 32.3% from 25 to 44, 22.9% from 45 to 64, and 11.8% who were 65 years of age or older. The median age was 37 years. For every 100 females, there were 98.1 males. For every 100 females age 18 and over, there were 91.5 males.

The median income for a household in the borough was $33,523, and the median income for a family was $39,000. Males had a median income of $28,875 versus $21,528 for females. The per capita income for the borough was $16,547. About 6.3% of families and 7.7% of the population were below the poverty line, including 9.3% of those under age 18 and 2.0% of those age 65 or over.

Government
The polling place is the community center, 318 Vine Street, New Berlin. , New Berlin's mayor was Bonnie Hamilton.

See also
Berlin, Pennsylvania
Berlin Township, Wayne County, Pennsylvania
Berlinsville, Pennsylvania
East Berlin, Pennsylvania
New Berlinville, Pennsylvania

References

External links

Populated places established in 1792
Boroughs in Union County, Pennsylvania
1795 establishments in Pennsylvania